Jumbun is an Aboriginal community located in Murray Upper, Cassowary Coast Region which is  south-west of Tully in Far North Queensland, Australia. The word "jumbun" means "wood-grub" in Girrimay. The residents of Jumbun are predominantly from the Girrimay and Dyirbal Aboriginal nations. At the 2011 census, Jumbun had a population of 104.

History 
Dyirbal (also known as Djirbal) is a language of Far North Queensland, particularly the area around Tully and Tully River Catchment extending to the Atherton Tablelands. The Dyirbal language region includes the landscape within the local government boundaries of Cassowary Coast Regional Council and Tablelands Regional Council.

Culture
The Jumbun Aboriginal community is known for its basket weavers who have retained the cultural knowledge for making the distinctive lawyercane bicornal basket styles including burrajingal, gundala and mindi. In recent times, these baskets were used for both everyday and ceremonial uses including carrying bush foods, babies, message sticks and ceremonial objects. The jawun style of bicornal basket is unique to the rainforest Aboriginal peoples of North Queensland. Other unique lawyercane artefacts include the wungarr, which was used in freshwater creeks to catch eels.

Examples of the jawun and other basket weaving styles are regularly shown in national exhibitions and older examples are kept in special "keeping places" which house important cultural artefacts. A "keeping place" has been built at Jumbun while the Girringun Aboriginal Corporation in Cardwell also has another (Davey "Buckeroo" Lawrence Education, Training and Cultural Centre on the Bruce Highway, 235 Victoria St Cardwell).

Tours
Jumbun has recently relaunched its cultural tours. These tours include an inspection of the Keeping Place before a cultural walk into the rainforest is undertaken to showcase the practical knowledge of plants and animals in the forest. Opportunities for basket weaving and traditional jewellery making with women from the community is a highlight of the tour, as well as the serenity of the Moombay campsite where the tour takes place, with the gentle sounds of birdsong and the Murray River making for a stunning backdrop for a unique cultural experience.

See also

 Australian Aboriginal culture

References

Towns in Queensland
Aboriginal communities in Queensland
Populated places in Far North Queensland
Cassowary Coast Region